Provincial Trunk Highway 19 (PTH 19) is a short east-west provincial highway in the west-central region of the Canadian province of Manitoba. It runs from PTH 5 near Norgate to PTH 10 near Wasagaming.  Most of the road is situated within Riding Mountain National Park

Route description 

As of 2018, PTH 19 is the only provincial trunk highway in Manitoba in which the entire length of the route is unpaved. The highway is closed to heavy truck traffic inside the park during the winter months.

PTH 19 provides access to campgrounds and hiking trails along Lake Katherine and Whirlpool Lake on the east side of the park, as well as access to the trailhead to Grey Owl's Cabin.

The speed limit on this highway is 90 km/h between PTH 5 and the East Entrance, and 60 km/h within the park limits.

History 
PTH 19 was designated in 1928 from Killarney to Wawanesa. In 1929, this became part of PTH 18. The current route for PTH 19 was designated in 1947.

References 

019